Macou may refer to:

 Îlet Macou, an island in Guadeloupe
 Macou Prospect, one of the Sixes mines in Georgia, United States

See also 
 Pape Macou Sarr, Senegalese footballer
 Macu (disambiguation)
 Macau (disambiguation)